Denis Olegovich Istomin (born 7 September 1986) is an Uzbek professional tennis player. He has won two singles titles (at the 2015 Aegon Open Nottingham and 2017 Chengdu Open) and achieved a career-high singles ranking of world No. 33 in August 2012. In January 2017, he defeated defending champion Novak Djokovic in the second round of the Australian Open.

Personal life
Denis Istomin was born in Orenburg to Russian parents Oleg and Klaudiya Istomin. His father moved the family to Tashkent, Uzbekistan, when Denis was 3 months old. Denis is coached by his mother, who introduced him to the sport at an early age. Injuries resulting from a car crash in 2001 en route to an event kept Istomin away from tennis for 2 years, with doctors initially stating that he would never hold a racquet again. Despite this, Istomin resumed training in April 2003.

He is good friends with Varvara Lepchenko, who previously played for Uzbekistan.

On court
Istomin is one of the few top ATP Professional players, along with Janko Tipsarević and Chung Hyeon, to wear glasses while playing (most players either have near perfect eyesight or wear contact lenses).

Career

2004–05: Turning Pro and breaking the top 200
Istomin broke into the top–200 late in 2005 and finished the year at No. 196. He won his first Challenger tournament in Bukhara.

2006
Istomin received the Asian wildcard into the 2006 Australian Open, where he played world No. 1 Roger Federer. Federer won in straight sets. He spent much of 2006 in the top 200, reaching a career-high of No. 186 on 1 May, and finished the year at No. 200 in singles.

2007
Istomin was slightly less successful in 2007, spending the entire year outside the top 200 in singles, but rallying towards the end of the year to finish at No. 230, again claiming the Asian Wild card for the 2008 Australian Open. In any case, he won two Challenger titles, Karshi and, for a second time, Bukhara. He reached his career-high of No. 157 on 18 June.

2008
Istomin entered the 2008 Australian Open as the Asian wild card. He lost in the second round to local favorite Lleyton Hewitt in four sets. Following successful results in a number of Challenger tournaments (including Karshi for the second time and Bukhara for the third time, he finished the season ranked No. 105.

2009: Breaking the top 100
Istomin again received the Asian wild card into the 2009 Australian Open. He played Vincent Spadea of the US in the first round and won in straight sets. He lost to Richard Gasquet in the second round. He had a more successful year, breaking into the top 100 for the first time and reaching world No. 56 in July. This ranking rise qualified him for main draw entry into the other Grand Slam tournaments. His best performance in the remaining Grand Slam events came at the 2009 US Open, where he reached the third round by defeating American wildcard Brendan Evans in straight sets, before earning a hard-fought win against Nicolás Lapentti in a fifth set tiebreak. He then lost against Marin Cilic in straight sets.

2010: First ATP final & breaking top 50
Istomin first competed in the 2010 Aircel Chennai Open, but was defeated in the first round by Dudi Sela. He then participated in the 2010 Australian Open. In the first round he routed No. 32 seed Jérémy Chardy and then defeated Michael Berrer in the second round. Istomin was defeated in the third round by No. 3 seed Novak Djokovic. He made his first semi-final at an ATP level tournament at the 2010 SAP Open, in San Jose. After beating Ryan Harrison in the opening round, he went on to beat fourth seed Tommy Haas and sixth seed Philipp Kohlschreiber en route to his first semis appearance. There, he lost to No. 2 seed Fernando Verdasco. At the 2010 Pilot Pen Tennis Istomin advanced to his first ATP Final, but was defeated by Sergiy Stakhovsky in three sets. This, along with third round appearances at Wimbledon and the French Open in 2010, sent him to his career high ranking of 39 on 30 August.

At the 2010 US Open Istomin defeated Máximo González in the first round. He was later defeated by No. 1 seed and eventual winner Rafael Nadal in the second round. Following this his ranking slipped down to No. 42. At the 2010 Asian Games tennis finals, Istomin lost to India's Somdev Devvarman in straight sets.

2011
Istomin started the year at number 40 in the ATP rankings, but had a poor run in the Australian swing, starting the year with a second round exit in Brisbane and then losing first round matches in the next two weeks in Sydney and then in the Australian Open.

He then reached the quarter-finals in San Jose until being stopped by Fernando Verdasco, then the world no. 9, before losing again two first rounds in a row in Memphis and Indian Wells. In the following week, Istomin reached the second round of Key Biscayne (losing to then world number 2, and triple Grand Slam winner that year, Novak Djokovic), before making another three consecutive first round exits on the clay circuit (Monte Carlo, Barcelona, Munich). After this he reached the second round in Nice on the lead-up to his second Grand Slam of the season, Roland Garros, where he lost his first round match to Italy's Fabio Fognini.

Istomin's poor run continued on grass, with first round exits at Queen's and Eastbourne. Istomin then beat Philipp Kohlschreiber in Wimbledon but lost to Mardy Fish, a top ten player then, in the second round. Amidst the European summer, he then returned to clay and made a second-round exit in Gstaad in between first-round losses in Hamburg and Kitzbuhel. By mid-August, Istomin's ranking had slipped to 81 after a prolonged form slump. He travelled to his home country, Uzbekistan, to compete in two Challengers (Samarkand and Karshi), both of which won. It was his third victory in the Karshi Challenger.

He then moved to the US hard courts, losing in the second round of both the new Winston-Salem Open and the US Open, beaten by Julien Benneteau. Following the US Open, Istomin returned to the Challenger circuit, where he won consecutive tournaments in Istanbul and Tashkent. In the Istanbul final he beat Philipp Kohlschreiber, whom he had also beaten in Wimbledon. This was Istomin's first tournament victory outside Uzbekistan in his career. He had an uneventful end of the season, with a second round loss to Viktor Troicki in Kuala Lumpur's indoor courts, and, failing to qualify for further ATP 250, ATP 500 and ATP 1000 tournaments, ended the season with two early exit showings in the Bratislava and Helsinki Challengers. He finished the year at the 74th place of the rankings, still well inside the top-100

2012: Career high ranking
Istomin defeated both Florian Mayer and Tommy Haas en route to a quarter-final loss to Bernard Tomic, in Brisbane. Still ranked No. 73 after the tournament, Istomin had to play the qualifying in Sydney, winning his three matches to qualify to the main draw, where he had an impressive run into the semi-finals as he swept past Pablo Andujar, Ryan Sweeting and 18-ranked Richard Gasquet, before losing to Jarkko Nieminen. The following week, at the Australian Open, Istomin was stopped by World No. 6 Jo-Wilfried Tsonga in the first round.

In February 2012, Istomin advanced to SAP Open finals, losing to defending champion Milos Raonic of Canada. After a first round loss in Memphis, and a second round loss in Delray Beach, Florida, he played one of his most successful tournaments at the Indian Wells Masters. He made the fourth round of the tournament (his previous best at a Masters tournament was the second round), beating No. 32 seed Juan Ignacio Chela and then the No. 5 player in the world, David Ferrer. He lost to Juan Martín del Potro to end his run. After nearly all first round defeats leading up to the French Open, his ranking was at 43 going into the tournament, losing to Rafael Nadal in the second round.

Following a second round loss at London/Queen's Club and a quarterfinal at Eastbourne, Istomin reached the fourth round of Wimbledon, becoming the first tennis player from Uzbekistan, man or woman, to make the fourth round of a Grand Slam. He lost in five sets to Mikhail Youzhny to end his bid for a quarterfinal appearance. At the Olympics, representing Uzbekistan, Istomin made the round of 16, losing to eventual silver medalist Roger Federer. During the USA hard court swing, Istomin made the second round of the Cincinnati Masters. At the US Open, he lost in the first round to Jürgen Zopp. He finished the year poorly, losing in all remaining tournaments in either the first or second round. During the Davis Cup that year, Istomin nearly led Uzbekistan to a World Group spot; Uzbekistan defeated New Zealand and India, but lost to Kazakhstan in the final playoff round.

2013: First doubles title
In January, Istomin advanced to the quarter-finals of the Brisbane International with wins over Martin Kližan and Lleyton Hewitt but was defeated by eventual champion Andy Murray. He then went on to enter the Apia International in Sydney, winning his first round and second round matches against James Duckworth and Fernando Verdasco to advance to the quarter-finals. He then lost to South African Kevin Anderson. Istomin reached the semi-finals of the U.S. National Indoor Tennis Championships where he beat John Isner, Lleyton Hewitt and Michael Russell before losing to eventual champion Feliciano Lopez. At the Rogers Cup third round, he challenged No. 1 Novak Djokovic, winning the first set before losing in a close third set.

2014
Istomin would start the new year in the 2014 Apia International Sydney Tournament. He beat his first round opponent Pablo Andújar and then pulled off a huge upset to down 7th seed Croatian player Marin Cilic in straight sets. He played Novak Djokovic in the third round of the 2014 Australian Open. Despite being two sets down and possibly facing a break, he played what was considered by some to be the "Perfect Game". He won all four points in the game consecutively with an ace down the middle, a running cross-court forehand passing shot, a backhand cross-court that was placed exactly on the line and an around-the-net backhand from behind the baseline, all of which were considered extremely risky shots. However he went on to lose in straight sets.

2015: First ATP title
Istomin won his first ATP world tour title at the Nottingham Open, where he defeated Sam Querrey in the final. Istomin also won a doubles title with Alexander Bury later that year.

2016
Istomin lost in the first round in Australian Open. He earned first tour-level win of 2016 against Borna Ćorić at the Miami Open. In March in the 2016 Irving Challenger he beat John-Patrick Smith of Australia. Istomin reached third round in Wimbledon where he lost to David Goffin in four sets.

2017: 200th victory, win over Novak Djokovic and Second ATP Title 
Istomin, then ranked 117 in the world, earned a wildcard to the 2017 Australian Open and upset defending champion and world No. 2 Novak Djokovic in the second round, coming back from 2 sets to 1 down to win in five sets. Istomin then went on to defeat Pablo Carreño Busta in the third round, advancing to the fourth round where he lost to Grigor Dimitrov. He made US$200,000 in prize money in total from the 2017 AO.

Istomin would later win the 2017 Chengdu Open, overcoming Marcos Baghdatis in the final to win the second ATP title of his career.

2018: Fifth ATP final, Gold medal at the Asian games
Istomin's form would slowly start to slip throughout 2018 as he lost in the first round of three for the four grand slams. His only slam win of the year coming at the Australian Open against Pierre-Hugues Herbert which remains his last slam win to date.

At the 2018 Austrian Open Kitzbühel, Istomin made his 5th ATP final and his last to date. He lost to Martin Kližan in straight sets.

At the 2018 Asian Games, Istomin won the gold medal in the men's singles which would earn him a spot at the 2020 Summer Olympics.

2019–2020
Istomin showed very poor form throughout 2019 and 2020. He posted a 4–15 win–loss record and his ranking dipped down to 177 by the end of 2019 and 184 by the end of 2020.

2021: Third Olympics participation 
At the 2021 French Open, Istomin made a surprise run through qualifying and qualified for the main draw. He lost to 8th seed Roger Federer in straight sets.

At the 2020 Olympics, Istomin faced Sumit Nagal in the first round where he lost in three sets.

ATP career finals

Singles: 5 (2 titles, 3 runner-ups)

Doubles: 5 (3 titles, 2 runner-ups)

Challenger and ITF Finals

Singles: 25 (17–8)

Performance timelines

Singles
Current through the 2022 Delray Beach Open.

Doubles

Wins over top 10 players
Istomin has a  record against players who were ranked in the top 10 at the time the match was played.

References

External links

 
 
 
 
 
 US Open Profile
 Istomin recent match results
 Istomin world ranking history
 Interview, tennis-prose.com; accessed 31 May 2014.

1986 births
Living people
Uzbekistani male tennis players
Sportspeople from Tashkent
Uzbekistani people of Russian descent
Asian Games medalists in tennis
Tennis players at the 2012 Summer Olympics
Tennis players at the 2016 Summer Olympics
Olympic tennis players of Uzbekistan
Tennis players at the 2006 Asian Games
Tennis players at the 2010 Asian Games
Tennis players at the 2014 Asian Games
Tennis players at the 2018 Asian Games
Asian Games gold medalists for Uzbekistan
Asian Games bronze medalists for Uzbekistan
Asian Games silver medalists for Uzbekistan
Medalists at the 2014 Asian Games
Medalists at the 2010 Asian Games
Medalists at the 2018 Asian Games
Tennis players at the 2020 Summer Olympics